Harris Musa Dzarma (born 1952) is a retired Nigerian Army major general who served as the 23rd Commandant of the Nigerian Defence Academy from 2006 to 2008 where he was considered one of the commandants to have served in the academy since its establishment in 1964 to replace the Nigeria Military Training College.

He enrolled at the Nigerian Defence Academy in 1973 as a member of the 14 Regular Combatant Course where he was coursemates with Lt-Gen Luka Yusuf and ACM Paul Dike.

He was replaced as Commandant in August 2008.

References

1952 births
Living people
Nigerian Army officers
Nigerian Defence Academy Commandants
Nigerian generals
Nigerian Defence Academy alumni